Hawar News Agency (sometimes abbreviated ANHA) is an news agency. The site started as an Arabic-only news service. Hawar News is linked to the Syrian Democratic Forces.

Ownership, identity and reliability 
The ownership of the Hawar News Agency is unpublished. The website's domain name was first registered in August 2012. The site's About page says just "ANHA". Pro-Syrian opposition source Verify-sy claims Hawar News is affiliated with the Democratic Union Party (PYD).

Access blocked from Turkey
The Turkish telecommunications regulator blocked access to several news agencies in July 2015. It comes following the end of the Kurdish Turkish peace process and was described as a counter-terrorism action, other Kurdish language or left-wing news sites based within and outside Turkey that were banned at the same time as Hawar News included Rudaw, Dicle News Agency, and Özgür Gündem.

References

Arab news agencies
Internet properties established in 2012
Arabic-language websites
2012 establishments in Syria
News agencies based in Syria
Kurdish-language mass media
Kurdish-language websites